A non-binding referendum on prohibition of liquor was held in Sweden on 27 August 1922. The proposal to prohibit the sale of alcohol failed, with 51% voting against the change on a turnout of 55.1%. Voting patterns were sharply divided between men and women, with 59% of women voting for the proposal and 59% of men voting against.

Campaign
There was plenty of campaigning from both sides, the best remembered poster being one designed by artist Albert Engström, with the famous quote Kräftor kräva dessa drycker ("crayfish require these drinks").

Both proponents and opponents of the prohibition used similar arguments based around the breakdown of family life and Swedish society.

Result

By county

See also
Referendums in Sweden
Alcohol in Sweden
Swedish temperance movements

References

Referendums in Sweden
1922 in Sweden
1922 referendums
Alcohol in Sweden
Prohibition by country
Prohibition referendums
August 1922 events